The 15th Cavalry Regiment is a cavalry regiment of the United States Army. It was one of the Expansion Units originally established for the Spanish–American War, but has been a general workhorse unit ever since.

History

Origins
The 15th Cavalry Regiment was formed in 1901 at the Presidio of San Francisco, California. Immediately upon its organization in 1901, the 15th Cavalry embarked for the Philippines to quell an insurrection in the United States' newly acquired territory. The regiment's next action was part of the Cuban Pacification from 1906 to 1909, followed by duty along the Mexican border and the hunt for Pancho Villa from December 1917 to March 1918.

World War One
When the United States entered World War I, the regiment sailed for France as one of the four mounted regiments on duty with the Allied Expeditionary Force. The fighting had already bogged down into trench warfare and the role of horse cavalry was nearly over. The 15th was called upon to dismount and relieve exhausted infantry units in the trenches. It was the tank that finally broke the trench lines to end both the war and the role of the horse soldier. The 15th served occupation duty after the war until June 1919 when it returned to the United States.

The 15th Cavalry Regiment was deactivated on 18 October 1921, after 20 years of continuous active service, as part of the massive cutbacks in the Regular Army following "the war to end all wars".

World War Two
With the advent of the Second World War, the 15th was again called to service in March 1942, this time with new mounts, the armored car and tank. After undergoing training at the Desert Training Center in California, the regiment sailed for the European Theater of Operations, arriving in Scotland in March 1944. Here, the 15th was reorganized as the 15th Cavalry Group (Mechanized). The group was composed of the 15th and 17th Reconnaissance Squadrons. The 15th Cavalry Group landed on Utah Beach on 5 July 1944 as part of Patton's Third Army. The 15th served in four major campaigns in Europe: Normandy, Northern France, Rhineland, and Central Europe. The 15th Cavalry Group and its two squadrons fought as part of the Third Army, Ninth Army and was later assigned as a security force for several different divisions. The end of the war found the 15th deep inside Germany, covering over 1000 miles of enemy held territory since landing on the Continent in July 1944. When the war ended, the 15th Cavalry Group and its two squadrons had taken nearly 7,000 German prisoners and had destroyed 78 guns and 495 enemy vehicles.

Postwar – the Constabulary Era
Following the war, the 15th was redesignated the 15th Constabulary Regiment, charged initially with occupation duty of the defeated Germany. The 17th Reconnaissance Squadron was deactivated in January 1947, but the 15th Squadron, redesignated as the 15th Constabulary Squadron, continued serving.  As the cold war began in earnest, the regiment's duty shifted to patrolling the border between West Germany and East Germany, as well as the border with Czechoslovakia. The Constabulary Force guarded the border until 1952.

Cold War
From 1952 to 1987, the regiment went through a series of redesignations, inactivations and reactivations. Elements of the regiment served across various Army units in Korea, Germany, and the United States. Troop G served in the Vietnam War from 1971 to 1972, being equipped at that time with the M551 Sheridan Armored Reconnaissance/Airborne Assault Vehicle (AR/AAV).

Reorganization and current status
In March 1987, the Army overhauled its Combat Arms Regimental System (CARS) to restore some order to the history and lineage of its regiments. One goal of this reform was to keep on active duty those regiments which had earned distinguished records over long years of service. The 15th Cavalry Regiment met this criteria and, in March 1987, was reactivated at Fort Knox, Kentucky, by the activation of its 5th Squadron (Sabers).  On 1 May 2018, the 2nd Squadron (Lions) was activated. Both Squadrons, as part of the 194th Armored Brigade, are charged with the mission of training the U.S. Army's enlisted Cavalry Scouts.

Lineage

15th Cavalry Regiment
Constituted 1901-02-01 in the Regular Army as the 15th Cavalry Regiment
Organized 1901-02-12 at the Presidio of San Francisco, California
Assigned in December 1917 to the 15th Cavalry Division
Relieved 1918-05-11 from assignment to the 15th Cavalry Division
Inactivated 1921-10-18 at Fort D.A. Russell, Wyoming
Redesignated 1942-03-22 as the 15th Cavalry Regiment, Mechanized, activated at Fort Riley, Kansas, and assigned to the Second Army.
Regiment moved to Camp Maxey, Texas on 1943-01-23, assigned to X Corps, and participated in the Louisiana Maneuvers of 1943-06-18-1943-08-28.
Regiment relocated to the Desert Training Center on 1943-08-20.
Regiment Staged at Camp Shanks, New York on 1944-02-14.
Regiment Deployed from the New York Port of Embarkation on 1944-03-01.
Regiment arrived in England on 1944-03-07.
Regiment broken up at Trowbridge, England, on 1944-03-12 and its elements reorganized and redesignated as follows:
Headquarters and Headquarters Troop, 15th Cavalry Group, Mechanized;
1st Squadron became 15th Cavalry Reconnaissance Squadron, Mechanized, attached to 15th Cavalry Group (Mech).
2nd Squadron became 17th Cavalry Reconnaissance Squadron, Mechanized, attached to 15th Cavalry Group (Mech).

After 12 March 1944, the above units underwent the following changes:

HHT, 15th Cavalry Group, Mechanized
Unit arrived in France on 1944-07-05.
Unit entered Combat on 1944-08-02 near Avranches for the assault on Brest; remained at St. Nazaire and Lorient until relieved by the 66th Infantry Division, and performed screening missions for the Ninth Army until 1945-02-13.
Unit attached to [XVI Corps] (United States) and crossed over into the Netherlands on 1945-02-16, and entered Germany on 1945-03-03.
Unit located at Montabaur, Germany on 1945-08-14, which is when the Japanese agreed to surrender.
Converted and redesignated 1946-05-01 as Headquarters and Headquarters Troop, 15th Constabulary Regiment
Reorganized and redesignated 1948-02-02 as Headquarters and Headquarters and Service Troop, 15th Constabulary Regiment
Inactivated 1948-12-20 in Germany
Converted and redesignated 1950-10-23 as Headquarters and Headquarters Company, 15th Armored Cavalry Group
Activated 1950-11-15 at Camp Polk, Louisiana
Redesignated 1953-09-25 as Headquarters and Headquarters Company, 15th Armor Group.
Inactivated 1955-12-01 at Fort Knox, Kentucky

15th Cavalry Reconnaissance Squadron, Mechanized (less Troop E)
Unit arrived in France on 1944-07-05.
Unit crossed over into the Netherlands on 1945-02-16.
Unit entered Germany on 1945-03-09.
Unit was located at Verl, Germany on 1945-08-14, which is the day that Japan agreed to surrender.
Converted and redesignated 1946-05-01 as the 15th Constabulary Squadron and assigned to the 15th Constabulary Regiment
Inactivated 1948-12-20 in Germany and relieved from assignment to the 15th Constabulary Regiment
Activated 1949-05-20 in Germany
Inactivated 1952-12-15 in Germany
Converted and redesignated 1954-08-13 as the 15th Reconnaissance Battalion

Troop E, 15th Cavalry Reconnaissance Squadron, Mechanized
Troop E, 15th Cavalry Reconnaissance Squadron, Mechanized, converted and redesignated 1946-05-01 as the Light Tank Troop, 15th Constabulary Regiment.
Inactivated 1947-02-28 in Germany
Disbanded 1953-02-25
Reconstituted 1954-08-14 in the Regular Army as Troop L, 15th Cavalry Regiment.

17th Cavalry Reconnaissance Squadron, Mechanized (Less Company F)
Unit arrived in France on 1944-07-15.
Unit crossed over into the Netherlands on 1945-02-16.
Unit entered Germany on 1944-11-23.
Unit was located at Wiedenburck, Germany on 1945-08-14, which is the day that Japan agreed to surrender.
17th Cavalry Reconnaissance Squadron, Mechanized, inactivated 1947-01-20 in Germany
Redesignated (less Company F) 1948-09-01 as the 501st Reconnaissance Battalion
Activated 1948-09-25 at Fort Sill, Oklahoma
Inactivated 1949-01-25 at Fort Sill, Oklahoma
Portions of the 17th's movements are dramatized in the book, "Teacher of the Year: The Mystery and Legacy of Edwin Barlow".

Company F, 17th Cavalry Reconnaissance Squadron, Mechanized
Redesignated 1948-09-01 as the 550th Light Tank Company
Redesignated 1951-03-19 as the 550th Tank Company
Activated 1951-04-06 at Fort Benning, Georgia
Inactivated 1958-06-25 at Fort Campbell, Kentucky
Redesignated 1958-10-01 as Troop F, 15th Cavalry Regiment

Consolidation
HHC, 15th Armor Group; 15th and 501st Reconnaissance Battalions; and Troops F and L, 15th Cavalry Regiment, consolidated, reorganized and redesignated 1957-04-01 to 1959-05-01 as the 15th Cavalry Regiment, a parent regiment under the Combat Arms Regimental System
Redesignated 1963-07-01 as the 15th Armor Regiment
Redesignated 1967-07-01 as the 15th Cavalry Regiment
Troop G, 15th Cavalry Regiment arrived in Vietnam on 1971-12-15. For this security assignment, Troop G was equipped with M-551 Sheridan Assault Vehicles in place of their normal Tracked Vehicles.
Troop G returned from Vietnam on 1972-02-26.
Withdrawn 1987-03-25 from the Combat Arms Regimental System, reorganized under the United States Army Regimental System, and transferred to the United States Army Training and Doctrine Command.
 2nd Squadron was activated on 1 May 2018 at Fort Benning, Georgia.

Honors

Campaign participation credit

Philippine Insurrection:
Mindanao;
Luzon 1902
World War I:
Streamer without inscription
World War II:
Normandy;
Northern France;
Rhineland;
Central Europe
Vietnam:
Consolidation II (Troop G only).

Decorations
None

Commanding officers
Colonels of the Regiment (Commanding Officers of the 15th Cavalry Regiment, 1901–55)
1st	COL William M. Wallace March 1901 – October 1906
2nd	COL George F. Chase October 1906 – May 1907
3rd	COL Joseph Garrard	  May 1907 – April 1914
4th	COL George H. Morgan	  April 1914 – July 1915
5th	COL William A. Shunk	  July 1915 – October 1916
6th	COL William H. Hay	  October 1916 – October 1917
7th	COL Melvin W. Rowell	  October 1917 – May 1918
8th	COL Herman A. Sievert	  May 1918 – July 1919
9th	COL Mortimer A.	Bigelow	  July 1919 – August 1919
10th	COL Michael M.	McNamee	  August 1919 – October	1919
11th COL Charles A. Hedekin October 1919 – February 1920
12th COL Michael M. McNamee February 1920 – April 1920
13th	COL Thomas B. Dugan	  April 1920 – September 1921
14th	COL Roy B. Harper	  September 1921 – October 1921
(Inactivated October 1921, reactivated March 1942)
15th COL J. Frank Richmond March 1942 – November 1942
16th	COL John B. Reybold	  November 1942 – August 1944
(Redesignated March 1944 as 15th Cavalry Group, Mechanized)
17th LTC Robert J. Quinn August 1944 – June 1945
18th COL David Wagstaff June 1945 – April 1946
(Redesignated May 1946 as 15th Constabulary Regiment)
19th COL Harold G. Holt April 1946 – July 1947
20th COL William H. Hill September 1947 – July 1948
21st LTC Evert S. Thomas July 1948 – December 1948
(Inactivated December 1948, reactivated November 1950 as 15th Armored Cavalry Group, Mechanized)
22nd COL Alan L. Fulton November 1950 – November 1952
23rd LTC Wilbur Stephenson November 1952 – July 1955
(Redesignated September 1953 as 15th Armor Group)
24th LTC Delbert Tanner July 1955 – December 1955
(15th Armor Group Inactivated December 1955, incorporated into the Combat Arms Regimental System 1957, regimental headquarters disbanded.)

References

Headquarters, 15th Cavalry Group (Mechanized). History of the 15th Cavalry Group – Normandy – Northern France – Rhineland – Central Europe Campaigns. (Unit Historical Officer: Verl, Germany, 1945).
Budmirovich, Michael. History of the 15th Cavalry Group. (Privately published, 1991).
Larson, Ross E. Regimental History 15th U.S. Cavalry 1901 – 1921. (Gov't Press, Ft. D.A. Russell, WY, 28 February 1923)
Nash, Douglas E. The 15th Cavalry Regiment – Yesterday, Today and Tomorrow. (Govt Press, Ft. Knox, KY 1989)

015
015
1901 establishments in California